Domus Galilaeae or House of Galilee, located on the peak of Mount of Beatitudes, above and north of Capernaum and the Sea of Galilee, is a Christian meeting place used for seminars and conventions, run by the Neocatechumenal Way. On his pilgrimage to Israel in 2000, Pope John Paul II visited Domus Galilaeae and said he hoped it would become a place for interreligious dialogue.

History
Domus Galilaeae employs about 150 people full-time, including labourers, technicians, and volunteers. There are 37 Arab Christian workers, 32 Arab Muslims, 21 Jewish technicians, 20 Druzes, and 10 Maronites.

The building was constructed in a short period of time, with the first stone being laid in January 1999 and the opening of the site taking place in 2000. It was inaugurated by the Pope John Paul II in his Millennium visit to the Holy Land. In the centre of the  library is an ancient Torah. The architect used traditional Tuscan building stone, "pietra serena" limestone and "pietra forte colombino" sandstone, polished and processed with great attention to detail. 

The centre is envisaged as a place where Christians will learn about the living tradition of Israel, following the footsteps of early Christian saints  "who returned to their Hebrew roots to understand the meaning of prayer, of feasts, and Hebrew liturgies".  John Paul II,  who exemplified a new era of affinity between Catholics and Jews, emphasised the need to appreciate Jewish roots in order to live-out authentic Christianity; he explicitly endorsed the continuing life and vitality of the Jewish faith and prayed for Jewish continuance.

See also
Christianity in Israel
Tourism in Israel

Gallery

References

Roman Catholic churches in Israel
Buildings and structures in Northern District (Israel)
Buildings and structures completed in 2000
Neocatechumenal Way
2000 establishments in Israel
Sea of Galilee